The 1982 World Lacrosse Championship was the fourth World Lacrosse Championship and was played at Homewood Field in Baltimore, Maryland, from June 18–25, 1982. The United States defeated Australia in the final to win the tournament.

Results

Standings

Final
United States 22, Australia 14

Awards
Best and Fairest Player: Jeff Kennedy, Australia.
Best Goalkeeper: Tommy Sears, United States. 
Best Defender: Mark Greenberg, United States.  
Best Midfielder: John Butkiewicz, Australia. 
Best Attackman: Brooks Sweet, United States.

All-World Team: 
Peter Cann, A, Australia; Brendan Schneck, A, United States; 
Brooks Sweet, A, United States; 
John Butkiewicz, M, Australia; 
Vinny Sombrotto, M, United States; 
Bob Teasdall, M, Canada; 
Mark Greenberg, D, United States; 
Chris Kane, D, United States; 
Jeff Mounkley, D, England; 
Tommy Sears, G, United States.

References

1982
1982
World Lacrosse Championship